In biochemistry, Michaelis–Menten kinetics is one of the best-known models of enzyme kinetics. It is named after German biochemist Leonor Michaelis and Canadian physician Maud Menten.

 

This equation is called the Michaelis–Menten equation. Here,  represents the maximum rate achieved by the system, happening at saturating substrate concentration for a given enzyme concentration. Biochemical reactions involving a single substrate are often assumed to follow Michaelis–Menten kinetics, without regard to the model's underlying assumptions.

Model

In 1901, French physical chemist Victor Henri found that enzyme reactions were initiated by a bond (more generally, a binding interaction) between the enzyme and the substrate. His work was taken up by German biochemist Leonor Michaelis and Canadian physician Maud Menten, who investigated the kinetics of an enzymatic reaction mechanism, invertase, that catalyzes the hydrolysis of sucrose into glucose and fructose. In 1913, they proposed a mathematical model of the reaction. It involves an enzyme, E, binding to a substrate, S, to form a complex, ES, which in turn releases a product, P, regenerating the original enzyme.  This may be represented schematically as

E{} + S <=>[\mathit{k_f}][\mathit{k_r}] ES ->[k_\ce{cat}] E{} + P

Under certain assumptions – such as the enzyme concentration being much less than the substrate concentration – the rate of product formation is given by

The reaction order depends on the relative size of the two terms in the denominator. At low substrate concentration , so that the reaction rate  varies linearly with substrate concentration [S] (first-order kinetics). This rate is attained when all enzyme is bound to substrate. , the turnover number, is the maximum number of substrate molecules converted to product per enzyme molecule per second. Further addition of substrate does not increase the rate which is said to be saturated.

The value of the Michaelis constant  is numerically equal to the [S] at which the reaction rate is at half-maximum, and is a measure of the substrate's affinity for the enzyme—a small  indicates high affinity, meaning that the rate will approach  with lower [S] than those reactions with a larger . The constant is not affected by the concentration or purity of an enzyme.

The model is used in a variety of biochemical situations other than enzyme-substrate interaction, including antigen–antibody binding, DNA–DNA hybridization, and protein–protein interaction. It can be used to characterise a generic biochemical reaction, in the same way that the Langmuir equation can be used to model generic adsorption of biomolecular species. When an empirical equation of this form is applied to microbial growth, it is sometimes called a Monod equation.

As the equation originated with Victor Henri, not with Michaelis and Menten, it is more accurate to call it the Henri–Michaelis–Menten equation.

Applications

Parameter values vary widely between enzymes:

The constant  (catalytic efficiency) is a measure of how efficiently an enzyme converts a substrate into product.

Michaelis–Menten kinetics have also been applied to a variety of topics outside of biochemical reactions, including alveolar clearance of dusts, the richness of species pools, clearance of blood alcohol, the photosynthesis-irradiance relationship, and bacterial phage infection.

The equation can also be used to describe the relationship between ion channel conductivity and ligand concentration.

Biological Oceanography

Michaelis Menten can also be applied to limiting nutrients and phytoplankton growth in the global ocean. The relationship is 

 

where V is uptake of the nutrient by phytoplankton, S is the concentration of the limiting nutrient,  is the maximum uptake rate by phytoplankton, and K is the half saturation constant. The relationship can also be understood for growth rate   and K also depend on phytoplankton physiology and genetics. Oligotrophic regions—regions that are nutrient depleted—often have phytoplankton populations characterized by low  and low K, which help them to efficiently take up the nutrient that is at low concentrations. These phytoplankton tend to be small, with large area to volume ratios. Phytoplankton in eutrophic regions—nutrient-replete regions—are often characterized by high  and K, which make them less efficient at taking up a given nutrient, but allows them to take up more of that nutrient. These phytoplankton tend to be large (e.g. diatoms) with a smaller area to volume ratio. Their larger  enables them to become larger. This relationship is generally applied to nitrate concentrations, as that is the limiting nutrient in much of the ocean, but other nutrients—for example, iron and phosphate—might also be limiting.

Derivation

Applying the law of mass action, which states that the rate of a reaction is proportional to the product of the concentrations of the reactants (i.e. ), gives a system of four non-linear ordinary differential equations that define the rate of change of reactants with time 

In this mechanism, the enzyme E is a catalyst, which only facilitates the reaction, so that its total concentration, free plus combined,  is a constant (i.e. ). This conservation law can also be observed by adding the first and third equations above.

Equilibrium approximation

In their original analysis, Michaelis and Menten assumed that the substrate is in instantaneous chemical equilibrium with the complex, which implies

From the enzyme conservation law, we obtain

Combining the two expressions above, gives us

Upon simplification, we get

where  is the dissociation constant for the enzyme-substrate complex. Hence the velocity  of the reaction – the rate at which P is formed – is

where  is the maximum reaction velocity.

Quasi-steady-state approximation

An alternative analysis of the system was undertaken by British botanist G. E. Briggs and British geneticist J. B. S. Haldane in 1925. They assumed that the concentration of the intermediate complex does not change on the time-scale of product formation – known as the quasi-steady-state assumption or pseudo-steady-state-hypothesis. Mathematically, this assumption means . Hence, following the same steps as above, the velocity  of the reaction is

where

is known as the Michaelis constant.

Assumptions and limitations

The first step in the derivation applies the law of mass action, which is reliant on free diffusion. However, in the environment of a living cell where there is a high concentration of proteins, the cytoplasm often behaves more like a viscous gel than a free-flowing liquid, limiting molecular movements by diffusion and altering reaction rates. Although the law of mass action can be valid in heterogeneous environments, it is more appropriate to model the cytoplasm as a fractal, in order to capture its limited-mobility kinetics.

However, each approach is founded upon a different assumption. The Michaelis–Menten equilibrium analysis is valid if the substrate reaches equilibrium on a much faster time-scale than the product is formed or, more precisely, that 

By contrast, the Briggs–Haldane quasi-steady-state analysis is valid if 

In both the Michaelis–Menten and Briggs–Haldane analyses, the quality of the approximation improves as  decreases. However, in model building, Michaelis–Menten kinetics are often invoked without regard to the underlying assumptions.

Importantly, while irreversibility is a necessary simplification in order to yield a tractable analytic solution, in the general case product formation is not in fact irreversible.  The enzyme reaction is more correctly described as

 E{} + S <=>[\mathit{k_{f_1}}][\mathit{k_{r_1}}] ES <=>[\mathit{k_{f_2}}][\mathit{k_{r_2}}] E{} + P.

In general, the assumption of irreversibility is a good one in situations where one of the below is true:

1. The concentration of substrate(s) is very much larger than the concentration of products:

 [S] \gg [P].

This is true under standard in vitro assay conditions, and is true for many in vivo biological reactions, particularly where the product is continually removed by a subsequent reaction.

2. The energy released in the reaction is very large, that is

In situations where neither of these two conditions hold (that is, the reaction is low energy and a substantial pool of product(s) exists), the Michaelis–Menten equation breaks down, and more complex modelling approaches explicitly taking the forward and reverse reactions into account must be taken to understand the enzyme biology.

Determination of constants

The typical method for determining the constants  and  involves running a series of enzyme assays at varying substrate concentrations , and measuring the initial reaction rate . 'Initial' here is taken to mean that the reaction rate is measured after a relatively short time period, during which it is assumed that the enzyme-substrate complex has formed, but that the substrate concentration held approximately constant, and so the equilibrium or quasi-steady-state approximation remain valid. By plotting reaction rate against concentration, and using nonlinear regression of the Michaelis–Menten equation, the parameters may be obtained. 

Before computing facilities to perform nonlinear regression became available, graphical methods involving linearisation of the equation were used. A number of these were proposed, including the Eadie–Hofstee diagram, Hanes–Woolf plot and Lineweaver–Burk plot; of these, the Hanes–Woolf plot is the most accurate. However, while useful for visualization, all three methods distort the error structure of the data and are inferior to nonlinear regression. Without proper estimation of  values, linearisation should be avoided. In addition, regression analysis using Least squares assumes that errors are normally distributed, which is not valid after a transformation of  values. Nonetheless, their use can still be found in modern literature.

In 1997 Santiago Schnell and Claudio Mendoza suggested a closed form solution for the time course kinetics analysis of the Michaelis–Menten kinetics based on the solution of the Lambert W function.
Namely,

where W is the Lambert W function and

Role of substrate unbinding

The Michaelis-Menten equation has been used to predict the rate of product formation in enzymatic reactions for more than a century. Specifically, it states that the rate of an enzymatic reaction will increase as substrate concentration increases, and that increased unbinding of enzyme-substrate complexes will decrease the reaction rate. While the first prediction is well established, the second is more elusive.  Mathematical analysis of the effect of enzyme-substrate unbinding on enzymatic reactions at the single-molecule level has shown that unbinding of an enzyme from a substrate can reduce the rate of product formation under some conditions, but may also have the opposite effect.  As substrate concentrations increase, a tipping point can be reached where an increase in the unbinding rate results in an increase, rather than a decrease, of the reaction rate. The results indicate that enzymatic reactions can behave in ways that violate the classical Michaelis-Menten equation, and that the role of unbinding in enzymatic catalysis still remains to be determined experimentally.

See also

 Eadie–Hofstee diagram
 Enzyme kinetics
 Functional response
 Gompertz function
 Hill equation (biochemistry)
 Hill contribution to Langmuir equation
 Langmuir adsorption model (equation with the same mathematical form)
 Lineweaver–Burk plot
 Monod equation (equation with the same mathematical form)
 Reaction progress kinetic analysis
 Steady state (chemistry)
 Victor Henri, who first wrote the general equation form in 1901
 Von Bertalanffy function

References

External links 
 Online   Vmax calculator (ic50.tk/kmvmax.html) based on the C programming language and the non-linear least-squares Levenberg–Marquardt algorithm of gnuplot
 Alternative online   calculator (ic50.org/kmvmax.html) based on Python, NumPy, Matplotlib and the non-linear least-squares Levenberg–Marquardt algorithm of SciPy

Further reading

Enzyme kinetics
Chemical kinetics
Ordinary differential equations
Catalysis